Monica G. Turner is an American ecologist known for her work at Yellowstone National Park since the large fires of 1988. She is currently the Eugene P. Odum Professor of Ecology at the University of Wisconsin–Madison.

Life and career 
Turner was raised in the suburbs of Long Island just outside New York city. Her father was a self-employed lawyer and her mother was a Girl Scouts executive. Turner obtained her B.S in Biology summa cum laude from Fordham University in 1980. Turner  went on to receive her Ph.D. in Ecology from the University of Georgia.

After finishing her Ph.D., she stayed at the University of Georgia as a postdoctoral researcher. She worked with Eugene P. Odum to examine the changes in land use in the Georgia landscape, one of the earliest US landscape ecology studies.

In 1986, together with Colleague Frank Golley, Turner helped organize the first American meeting for landscape ecology. In 1987, after completion of her postdoctoral research, Turner went on to become a staff scientist at the Oak Ridge National Laboratory. At Oak Ridge, Turner began a project on the spatial distribution of land use in forests of the southern Appalachian Mountains.

Work at Yellowstone
During her time at Oak Ridge, her group developed simulations important in modeling key concepts in landscape ecology, including predictions of species movement patterns, spread of disturbance, and the connectivity of habitats across landscapes. In 1988, Turner sought to find a landscape in which to study her model. After rejoining with fellow ecologist Bill Romme, an expert in Yellowstone fire-history, Turner was able to find the landscape she needed in the fire-ridden Yellowstone, in which more than one-third of the park had been burned.

That 1988 "summer of fire" made Yellowstone history. Early blazes, sparked in June by a combination of lightning and human activities, burned for several weeks without raising much concern. As the summer got hotter and drier, though, the situation quickly turned. In July, "we had active fires spread, but nothing that we hadn't previously experienced," recalls Roy Renkin, a Yellowstone biologist. "But then, here came August. ... Then things started to really pick up and go." Turner also examined the regrowth of lodgepole pine and other dominant tree species in the park. Turner and Romme began working in the park in the summer of 1989. With no funding, they recruited volunteer labor. Friends, former students, and family members pitched in when they could. Even Turner’s mother spent her two weeks of vacation in the park measuring burned trees.

Turner's work at Yellowstone gave insight into vegetation dynamics concerning changing disturbance regimes, vertebrate grazing, and soil-microbe nutrient interactions. After Yellowstone's stand-replacing fire in 2000, Turner found that relatively large amounts of ammonium depletion occurred during the first four years.

Turner’s work at Yellowstone, over a period of 20 years, has provided an insight unto the resiliency of ecosystems after major disturbances. Turner, on the future of ecological disturbances, stated ‘‘As we continue to deal with the effects of global warming, I think we are going to see an increasing frequency, severity, and range of disturbances, which will produce much more interaction.’’

Current work

Turner's current research at the University of Wisconsin includes:
 Fire, vegetation and ecosystem processes in Yellowstone National Park
 Bark beetles, fire and salvage logging in the Greater Yellowstone Ecosystem
 Landscape dynamics and ecological change in the Southern Appalachians
 Land-water interactions in north temperate landscapes
 Tools and resources for landscape ecology

Awards
Turner was elected to the United States National Academy of Sciences in 2004. In 2008, she received the ECI Prize in terrestrial ecology and the Robert H. MacArthur Award from the Ecological Society of America. In 2020 she was awarded the Benjamin Franklin Medal (Franklin Institute).

Books
 Landscape Heterogeneity and Disturbance
 Quantitative Methods in Landscape Ecology
 Landscape Ecology in Theory and Practice (co-authored with R.H. Gardner and R.V. O'Neill)
 Learning Landscape Ecology: A Practical Guide to Concepts and Techniques (co-authored Gergel, S.E.)
 Ecosystem Function in Heterogeneous Landscapes (co-authored Lovett, G.M., C.G. Jones and K.C. Weathers)
 Foundation Papers in Landscape Ecology (co-authored with  Wiens, J.A., M.R. Moss and D. J. Mladenoff)

References

External links
 Profiles of Professional Ecologists: Monica G. Turner, in the Ecological Society of America.
 Profile ECI Prize Winner: Monica G Turner, in the Inter-Research Science Center
 Ecosystem and Landscape Ecology Lab of Dr. Monica G Turner at University of Wisconsin–Madison
 http://www.zoology.wisc.edu/faculty/tur/Tur.html Faculty Page at the University of Wisconsin–Madison

Living people
Women ecologists
American ecologists
Fordham University alumni
University of Georgia alumni
University of Wisconsin–Madison faculty
Members of the United States National Academy of Sciences
Fellows of the Ecological Society of America
Year of birth missing (living people)
Ecology journal editors